Edmund Wilson Greenwood (21 September 1881 – 7 September 1948) was an Australian politician.

He was born in Campbelltown in Tasmania to Methodist minister Henry Greenwood and Caroline Jane Tuckfield. The family moved to Victoria around 1890, and Greenwood became an office boy and from 1897 a farm labourer. He suffered an accident in 1902 and returned to Melbourne, becoming a commercial traveller. From 1904 he ran a tent manufacturing firm, which eventually expanded to become a large softgoods warehouse. On 6 February 1906 he married Myra Frances Burchett, with whom he had seven children. In 1917 he was elected to the Victorian Legislative Assembly for Boroondara; he was considered a Nationalist, but never sought formal party endorsement. He continued in the Assembly, transferring to Nunawading in 1927, until he retired to allow Robert Menzies to run for a lower house seat in 1929. Greenwood died in Richmond in 1948.

References

1881 births
1948 deaths
Nationalist Party of Australia members of the Parliament of Victoria
Members of the Victorian Legislative Assembly
20th-century Australian politicians